Mickaël Le Bihan (born 16 May 1990) is a French professional footballer who plays as a striker for Ligue 2 club Dijon.

Club career

Le Havre
Playing for Le Havre, Le Bihan scored 18 goals during the 2014–15 Ligue 2 season, thereby becoming the league's top scorer.

Nice
On 2 September 2015, Le Bihan joined Ligue 1 team OGC Nice for a reported transfer fee of €1.5 million. Just three weeks later, on 23 September 2015, he suffered a fractured tibia in a Ligue 1 match against Bordeaux. In January 2016, Nice announced that an operation would be necessary and that he would miss the rest of the season.

On 24 February 2017, he returned to the pitch after a 17-month injury lay-off, scoring a brace in a 30-minute, second-half substitute appearance in a Ligue 1 home match against Montpellier to help Nice come back from a 0–1 deficit to win 2–1.

On 24 May 2019, Le Bihan scored his first goal in over two years after again being plagued by injuries.

References

External links
 
 

Living people
1990 births
People from Ploemeur
Sportspeople from Morbihan
Association football midfielders
Association football forwards
French footballers
CS Sedan Ardennes players
Le Havre AC players
OGC Nice players
AJ Auxerre players
Dijon FCO players
Ligue 1 players
Ligue 2 players
Championnat National 2 players
Championnat National 3 players
Footballers from Brittany